Irena Borecká (born 5 November 1980, in Brno) is a Czech former basketball player who competed in the 2004 Summer Olympics.

References

1980 births
Living people
Czech women's basketball players
Olympic basketball players of the Czech Republic
Basketball players at the 2004 Summer Olympics
Sportspeople from Brno